The Confederación Nacional del Trabajo (CNT) is a Spanish confederation of anarcho-syndicalist labor unions, which was long affiliated with the International Workers' Association (AIT). When working with the latter group it was also known as CNT-AIT. Historically, the CNT has also been affiliated with the Federación Anarquista Ibérica; thus, it has also been referred to as the CNT-FAI. Throughout its history, it has played a major role in the Spanish labor movement.

Founded in 1910 in Barcelona from groups brought together by the trade union Solidaridad Obrera, it significantly expanded the role of anarchism in Spain, which can be traced to the creation of the Spanish chapter of the IWA in 1870 and its successor organization, the Federation of Workers of the Spanish Region.

Despite several decades when the organization was illegal in Spain, today the CNT continues to participate in the Spanish worker's movement, focusing its efforts on the principles of workers' self-management, federalism, and mutual aid.

Organization and function

Membership 
The CNT says of its membership, "We make no distinction at the time of admission, we require only that you are a worker or a student, employed or unemployed. The only people who cannot join are those belonging to repressive organizations (police, military, security guards), employers or other exploiters".

Objectives
As a union organization, and in accordance with its bylaws, the aims of the CNT are to "develop a sense of solidarity among workers", hoping to improve their conditions under the current social system, prepare them for future emancipation, when the
means of production have been socialized, to practice mutual aid amongst CNT collectives, and maintain relationships with other like-minded groups hoping for emancipation of the entire working class. The CNT is also concerned with issues beyond the working class, desiring a radical transformation of society through revolutionary syndicalism. To achieve their goal of social revolution, the organization has outlined a social-economic system through the confederal concept of anarchist communism, which consists of a series of general ideas proposed for the organization of an anarchist society. The CNT draws inspiration from anarchist ideas, and also identifies with the struggles of different social movements. The CNT is internationalist, but also supports communities' right of self-determination and their sovereignty over the state.

Structure 
The organizational structure of the CNT is based on direct democracy.

Industrial union and various posts union 

The industrial unions (sometimes referred to as "branch unions") form the base structure of the CNT. Each industrial union groups together workers of different crafts within an industry. When there are fewer than 25 people working in one particular industry, a various posts union is formed for that industry, rather than multiple industry unions. A various posts union can include workers from different crafts and industries; it requires a minimum of five people. If this number cannot be reached, four or fewer workers can form a confederal group. Due to the small size of the CNT, a majority of its unions are various posts unions.

The decision-making power of the industry and various posts unions resides in the union assembly: decisions are taken by all of the workers of the union in question via a system of direct democracy and consensus. These assemblies may address any number of issues, whether "local, provincial, regional, national or international".

Union sections 
Union sections are assemblies of union workers who work in the same work centre or small business. The assembly of the union section chooses a delegation for the union section, which is usually rotated and which will represent the opinions of the union section in meetings with other entities, although it does not have decision-making powers.

Committees and secretaryships 
The assembly chooses a committee to carry out routine or administrative duties that do not require the discussion of all members; the committee does not have decision-making powers. Committees can organise themselves through different departments, including propaganda, culture and archives; press and information; treasury and economic affairs; legal and prisoner advocacy; union action; social action; and general secretariat. The number of secretaryships can vary, sometimes two or more overlapping on a single one if considered necessary. Delegations from the union sections of the branch businesses are also part of the committee.

Federations and confederations 
Unlike organizations that are organized from the top down, the CNT organises itself in an anarchistic fashion, from the bottom up, through different levels of confederations, following the Principle of Federation. The reason for favoring this structure is intended to limit homogeneity in committees, and keep them from having politics or programs. It is also intended to minimize the power of individuals who may be more active in the organization.

Local and comarcal federations 
The different industry and various posts unions of a particular municipality constitute the local federation of unions that are coordinated by means of a local committee which has the same characteristics and powers as the union committees. The local committee is selected in the local plenary assembly to which every industry and various posts union can send delegations with written agreements previously adopted in their assembly. CNT has Local Federations in Madrid, Barcelona, Granada, and Seville. In turn, the unions of neighbouring municipalities can group together into a comarcal federation.

Regional confederations 

A regional confederation brings together several local unions within a geographic regional zone. The structure is the same again: a regional committee with a secretary general and the rest of the Secretariats in a regional plenary to which the local unions send delegations with written agreements previously made in the assembly. The regional division of the CNT has undergone changes through time.

National confederation 
The regional confederations send representative delegations—again on the same basis—to the national plenary assembly, which constitutes the national confederation. The national plenary of regional confederations elects a national general secretary, who moves the CNT headquarters to his/her place of residence. Hence, the CNT has no fixed headquarters.

The local plenary of the local federation chosen as headquarters gathers to designate the rest of the secretarial offices. The General Secretary and the rest of the secretaries form the Permanent Secretariat of the National Committee (SPCN, in Spanish) of the CNT, along with the General Secretariats of each of the regions. As in every committee in the CNT, their capacities are technical or administrative: they have no authority to make decisions for others.

Congress of the CNT 
Direct representatives of the industry and various posts unions attend the CNT Congress with agreements from their own assemblies, independently from the local and regional levels. Among its duties, the Congress has to decide upon the CNT general line of action, and can appoint new National Committees. Since the foundation of the CNT in 1910 and the initial constitutional congress in September 1911, nine congresses have taken place, four prior to the Spanish Civil War, and six since the Spanish transition to democracy.

The Congress is convened by the National Committee a year beforehand when there is an imperative need or there are new issues to assess. The discussion subjects are presented after being confirmed in a national plenary session, and then seven months before the Congress each member union starts its own debate which culminates with the presentation of their ideas to the Congress.

Plenarias and plenary assemblies 
The meetings of the various committees (local, regional, national) are called plenarias. Plenarias cannot take decisions, only develop technical and administrative issues, as they are constituted by committees without decision-making powers.

Another method of decision-making is through local and regional plenaries (or plenary assemblies), and congresses, in which industry and various posts unions take active part sending delegations with previously reached and written agreements. The National Plenary does not follow this rule, as in this case the delegations with the written agreements come from the regional confederations.

Parallel Structures

Conferences 
CNT conferences are open meetings in which matters are discussed and themes proposed; they serve to take the pulse of general opinion within the organization at any given moment. The discussions are later passed on to the local unions for their perusal. Persons representing themselves or another group or trade union may attend, but they cannot pass resolutions.

Industry federations 

Industry federations are organized by branch of production, not geographically. All CNT unions in a particular branch of production form the national industry federation of that branch, differing from the structure of branch unions organized by local and regional federations and confederations. Industry federations exist on a regional level as well. Industry federations are empowered to act regarding matters lying within their area of responsibility. They send representatives that can speak, but not vote, at the national and regional confederations.

Relationship with the ICL 

The International Confederation of Labor (ICL, CIT in Spanish), founded on 2018 in Parma, Italy, is a transnational organization which consists of delegations from a number of countries. The organizations are known as the sections of the ICL. CNT is the Spanish section.

Other Organs

Media 
The CNT journal CNT, or Periódico CNT (CNT Journal), operates autonomously. Its directorship and headquarters are chosen in a congress or national plenary. The directorship manages its distribution, printing, sales, and subscriptions, as well as selecting from among articles submitted. The chosen director attends the CNT National Committee's meetings on a non-voting basis. The Secretary General of the CNT is responsible for writing Periódico CNT's editorial page. Periódico CNT is published monthly, under a Creative Commons copyleft license and it is available in printed and online format.

All organs and trade unions within the CNT may have their own media. Solidaridad Obrera ("Workers' Solidarity") is the journal of the Regional Confederation of Labor of Catalonia. It was established in 1907, being the oldest communication medium of the CNT. Other media are La tira de papel, the Graphic Arts, Media and Shows National Coordinator bulletin; the Cenit, newspaper of the Regional Committee of the Exterior; and BICEL, edited by the Anselmo Lorenzo Foundation, which was created in 1987. The foundation works autonomously, and its directorship is elected in a national plenary congress. Some of its duties are to maintain, catalogue and publicly display historic properties of the CNT, to publish books and other media, including BICEL, the Internal Bulletin of Centers of Anarchist Studies, to prepare cultural events during CNT or AIT congresses: lectures, debates, conferences, videoforums, book presentations, etc., and to coordinate with other similar projects.

Voting 
The CNT generally avoids bringing matters to a vote, preferring consensus decision-making, which it considers to be more in tune with its anarchist principles. While pure consensus is plausible for individual base unions, higher levels of organizations cannot completely avoid the need for some type of vote, which is always done openly by a show of hands.

The CNT attempts to minimize this problem by a system of limited proportional voting. Even so, this system has some failures and may discriminate against unions with larger memberships. As an example, "ten unions with 25 adherents would total 250 members having 10 votes. This would be more votes than a union of 2,500, which with 10 times more members would only have the right to 7 votes." Within the CNT this isn't considered a major problem, because agreements tend to reach consensus after long discussions. However, due to the nature of consensus decision-making, the final agreements consensed to may bear little resemblance to the initial proposals brought to the table.

Methods 

The CNT is rooted in three basic principles: workers' self-management or autogestión, federalism and mutual aid, and considers that work conflicts must be settled between employers and employees without the action of such intermediaries as official state organisms or professional unionists. This is why the union criticizes union elections and works councils as means of control for managers, preferring workers' assemblies, union sections and direct action. Also, when possible, the CNT avoids taking legal action through the courts. Administrative positions in the union rotate and are unpaid. They prefer linear salary raises to increases that are percentage based, because the former increase equality of salaries. (That is, they prefer that all workers have their pay raised by the same absolute amount rather than the same percentage of their previous wage.)

The CNT's usual methods of action include exhibiting banners in front of the headquarters of companies with which the union has a conflict, and calls for consumer boycotts of their products and for social solidarity with the aggrieved workers. During strikes, resistance funds are created to help strikers and their families economically.

The CNT is organized around craft unions. This practice was adopted around 1918 in times of great class struggle under the reign of Alfonso XIII:

History

The early years 

The Spanish anarchist movement lacked a stable national organization during its early years. The anarchist Juan Gómez Casas described the evolution of the anarchist organization prior to the creation of the CNT:

At the beginning of the 20th century there was a consensus among anarchists that a new national labor organization was necessary, to bring coherence and strength to the movement.  During the Bourbon restoration (1874–1931), carried out by the traditional and dynastic parties represented by Cánovas del Castillo and Mateo Sagasta, a large portion of the workers' movement united around the Spanish Socialist Workers' Party as a political force, and around the Unión General de Trabajadores (UGT, "Workers' General Union") for collective bargaining purposes. There were also republican movements with a stronger parliamentary emphasis, which was supported by a portion of the new bourgeoisie.

In 1910, in the middle of the restoration, the CNT was founded in Barcelona in a congress of the Catalan trade union Solidaridad Obrera (Workers' Solidarity) with the objective of constituting an opposing force to the then-majority trade union, the socialist UGT and "to speed up the economic emancipation of the working class through the revolutionary expropriation of the bourgeoisie". The CNT started small, counting 26,571 members represented through several trade unions and other confederations.

In 1911, coinciding with its first congress, the CNT initiated a general strike that provoked a Barcelona judge to declare the union illegal until 1914. That same year of 1911, the trade union officially received its name.

In 1916 the CNT changed its strategy respecting the UGT, establishing new relations that allowed the two unions to initiate the general strike of 1917 jointly. The second congress of the CNT in 1919 studied the possibility of merging both organizations to unify the Spanish labor movement. That same congress approved linking the CNT to the Third International, but after Ángel Pestaña's visit to the Soviet Union, and on his advice, they broke definitively from the Third International in 1922.

Peak of the CNT
From 1918 on the CNT grew stronger. These  were known to have killed 21 union leaders in 48 hours.

The CNT had an outstanding role in the events of the  general strike, which paralyzed 70% of industry in Catalonia in 1919, the year the CNT reached a membership of 700,000. The Government settled the strike by granting all the striking workers demands that included an eight-hour day, union recognition, and the rehiring of fired workers.

In 1922 the International Workingmen's Association (later International Workers' Association) was founded in Berlin; the CNT joined immediately. However, the following year, with the rise of Miguel Primo de Rivera's dictatorship, the labor union was outlawed, once again.

The FAI would play an important role during the following years through the so-called  (connection) with the CNT, that is, the presence of FAI elements in the CNT, encouraging the labor union not to move away from its anarchist principles, an influence that continues today.

The Second Republic

After the fall of the monarchy in 1931, the CNT offered minimal support to the Second Republic. This support decreased progressively during the years between 1931 and 1933 because of constant confrontations with the republican authorities in the successive general strikes. The end of that period was marked by so-called revolutions of January and December, both of which were swiftly suppressed by the government. In those days the CNT functioned primarily in Catalonia, but was also gaining importance in other regions, such as Andalusia and Aragon (where it had a higher membership than the UGT).

In Ceuta, the CNT's organ was the weekly Despertar, launched in December 1931, but its publication was discontinued the next year.

Tensions between the radical faístas, or FAI members, and the moderate non-faístas were constant and difficult to analyze because of the decentralized and sectorial nature of the organization. Finally, in 1931 a group of moderates published the Manifesto of the Thirty, which would give rise to Treintism (from treinta, thirty in Spanish), and in 1932 Ángel Pestaña split from the CNT to create the Syndicalist Party.

In January 1932 a revolutionary strike organized by the CNT took place in Alt Llobregat, Catalonia. In some places the workers took control of the streets and proclaimed libertarian communism replacing the republican flags with the red and black ones. The strike was suppressed by the use of the police and the military and several leading figures of the workers' side were arrested and some deported to Spanish colonies in Africa (Spanish Morocco, Western Sahara and Guinea).

In January 1933 a revolution was carried out by the CNT. The first acts of the insurrection took place in January 1st, with bombs exploding in La Fulguera, Asturias, and street riots in Seville, Lleida and Pedro Muñoz. By 8 January the revolution had spread to most of Spain reaching its greatest resonance in Andalusia. The revolution was violently suppressed: in Bugarra, where the workers had proclaimed libertarian communism after an intense combat with the police, the Guardia Civil retook control of the town and killed 10 peasants while also detaining 250 more. The most well-known case of repression was the Casas Viejas incident which discredited the government partly leading to its electoral defeat in 1933 elections. During riots in Casas Viejas, where workers had proclaimed libertarian communism, two police officers were wounded, leading the government to send larger police forces to arrest rioters and stop the rebellion. Many peasants fled the town but a group of anarchists resisted arrest and were barricaded in the house of an anarchist, Francisco Cruz Gutiérrez. When the guards under the command of Captain Rojas arrived, they set the house on fire with the anarchists and their families still inside. Everyone inside the house was killed except for Maria Silva Cruz and a little boy. The police then gathered all villagers who owned a gun, marched them to the ashes of the burned house and shot them dead.

The third insurrection carried out by the CNT during the Second Spanish Republic was in December 1933 after the 1933 elections. It had its epicenter in Zaragoza and more generally in Aragon and La Rioja and it extended to parts of Extremadura, Andalusia, Catalonia and the mining basin of León. It lasted about a week before being completely dominated by law enforcement and in some places by the intervention of the army.

The two years governed by the coalition of the center to center-right Partido Republicano Radical and the right to far-right CEDA were marked by mostly clandestine CNT activity, in the face of severe government repression. During the socialist Revolution of October 1934 (at which point membership in the CNT reached 1.58 million) the CNT participated only from the background. However, the CNT's Regional Confederation of Labor of Asturias, León and Palencia actively participated in the revolution because of its loyalty to workers' alliances, this time formalized through the Uníos Hermanos Proletarios (UHP; Unite Brothers of the Proletariat) in the pact with the UGT and the Asturian Socialist Federation. Thus, in La Felguera and in El Llano district of Gijón there were short periods when anarchist communism was put into practice:

It is believed that 30,000 people were imprisoned during this period. The successful transportation strike in Zaragoza, followed by a more-than-two-week general strike, was convoked in 1935 jointly with the UGT. However, this collaboration was not to be repeated in later actions.

After Lerroux's government crumbled, the 1936 elections placed the CNT at a crossroads. Opinions inside the organization were split among the supporters of abstentionism, those who wanted to allow the workers to choose whether or not to vote, or those directly advocating a vote for the Popular Front. This coalition party promised amnesty for prisoners, and part of the growth of the Front appears to have been thanks to the anarchist vote.

The CNT held a congress in Saragossa on 1 May, ratifying the position that the union should make no pacts with any political party, despite UGT leader Largo Caballero's attempts to persuade the union to stand in unity with the UGT.

On 1 June, the CNT joined the UGT in declaring a strike of "building workers, mechanics, and lift operators." A demonstration was held, 70,000 workers strong. Members of the Falange attacked the strikers. The strikers responded by looting shops, and the police reacted by attempting to suppress the strike. By the beginning of July, the CNT was still fighting, while the UGT had agreed to arbitration. In retaliation to the attacks by the Falangists, anarchists killed three bodyguards of the Falangist leader José Antonio Primo de Rivera. The government then closed the CNT's centers in Madrid, and arrested David Antona and Cipriano Mera, two CNT militants.

The Civil War

1936
After periods of clandestine operation followed by other shorter periods of legalization, in 1936 the CNT was finally legalized, and would remain legal until the end of the Civil War. During the war, the union collaborated with other republican groups opposed to the Nationalists. As the war developed, members of the CNT came to form part of the government of the Republic, holding various ministries and high positions within the administration.

In Barcelona, the anarchists managed the majority of the functions of society, collectivizing a large part of the activity of the city, as George Orwell described:

Across the border from Catalonia in the nominally Republican eastern portion of the divided Aragon, the republican state was similarly powerless. The Confederal militias, which occupied Lower Teruel and Huesca, established defense committees that replaced the old city councils. In zones that had more anarchist presence before the war, collectivization of the land was carried out with great success. These first collectivizations were voluntary and were established from the lands that belonged to the members and those which had been requisitioned from those who were fugitive or missing. Those property-owners who wanted to keep possession of their land were not allowed to hire outside their families, and those lands they could not farm passed under community control.

George Orwell wrote of the nature of the new society that arose in the communities:

Some of the most important communities in this respect were those of Alcañiz, Calanda, Alcorisa, Valderrobres, Fraga or Alcampel. Not only were the lands collectivized, but collective labours were also undertaken, like the retirement home in Fraga, the collectivization of some hospitals (such as in Barbastro or Binéfar), and the founding of schools such as the School of Anarchist Militants. These institutions would be destroyed by the Nationalist troops during the war.

The committee held an extraordinary regional plenary session to protect the new rural organization, gathering all the union representatives from the supporting villages and backed by Buenaventura Durruti. Against the will of the mainly Catalan CNT National Committee, the Regional Defence Council of Aragon was created.

The Civil War era also showed a spirit of sexual revolution. The anarchist women's organization Mujeres Libres established an equal opportunity for women in a society that traditionally had held women in lower regard. Women acquired power they had not previously had in Spanish society, fighting at the front and doing heavy jobs, things that had been forbidden to them until then. Free love became popular, although some parents' distrust produced the creation of the revolutionary weddings, informal ceremonies in which the couples declared their status, and that could be annulled if both parties didn't want to continue their relationship.

Following Largo Caballero's assumption of the position of Prime Minister of the government, he invited the CNT to join in the coalition of groups making up the national government. The CNT proposed instead that a National Defense Council should be formed, led by Largo Caballero, and containing five members each from the CNT and UGT, and four "liberal republicans". When this proposal was declined, the CNT decided not to join the government. However, in Catalonia, the CNT joined the Central Committee of the Anti-Fascist Militias, which joined the Generalitat on 26 September. For the first time, three members of the CNT were also members of the government.

In November, Caballero once again asked the CNT to become part of the government. The leadership of the CNT requested the finance and war ministries, as well as three others, but were given four posts, the ministries of health, justice, industry, and commerce. With Federica Montseny became Minister of Health, the first female minister in Spain. Juan García Oliver, as minister of justice, abolished legal fees and destroyed all criminal files. Shortly afterwards, despite the disapproval of the anarchist ministers, the capital was moved from Madrid to Valencia. In Catalonia CNT was instrumental in preventing a Catalanist coup d'etat, planned in November by Estat Català.

On 23 December 1936, after receiving in Madrid a retinue formed by Joaquín Ascaso, Miguel Chueca and three republican and independent leaders, the government of Largo Caballero, which by then had four anarchists as ministers (García Oliver, Juan López, Federica Montseny and Joan Peiró), approved the formation of the National Defense Committee. It was a revolutionary body which represented anarchists as much as socialists and republicans.

1937
Halfway through February 1937, a congress took place in Caspe with the purpose of creating the Regional Federation of Collectives of Aragon. 456 delegates, representing more than 141,000 collective members, attended the congress. The congress was also attended by delegates of the National Committee of the CNT.

At a plenary session of the CNT in March 1937, the national committee asked for a motion of censure to suppress the Aragonese Regional Council. The Aragonese regional committee threatened to resign, which thwarted the censure effort. Though there had always been disagreements, that spring also saw a great escalation in confrontations between the CNT-FAI and the Communists. In Madrid, Melchor Rodríguez, who was then a member of the CNT, and director of prisons in Madrid, published accusations that the Communist José Cazorla, who was then overseeing public order, was maintaining secret prisons to hold anarchists, socialists, and other republicans, and either executing, or torturing them as "traitors". Soon after, on this pretext, Largo Caballero dissolved the Communist-controlled Junta de Defensa. Cazorla reacted by closing the offices of Solidaridad Obrera.
In Catalonia, the Catalan Communists in the Catalan government made several demands that provoked the ire of the anarchists, in particular the call for turning all weapons over to the control of the government. The 8 April 1937 issue of Solidaridad Obrera opined, "We have made too many concessions and have reached the moment of turning off the tap," while the 2 May issue urged workers to prevent the government from disarming them. On the 25th, Juan Negrín sent security forces to take over posts on the French border in the Pyrenees that had until then been controlled by the CNT, anarchists in Bellver de Cerdanya fought with Negrín's carabineros, and Roldán Cortada, the Communist leader of the UGT was killed, allegedly by an anarchist. Cortada's funeral was used by the PSUC as an anti-CNT demonstration. Because of all the conflict, the UGT and CNT agreed with the Generalitat to cancel any celebrations on May Day. On 3 May, Assault Guards of the government attempted to take over the CNT-controlled telephone exchange building in Barcelona, but were held off by gunfire. The assault guard laid siege to the building, and fighting between the anarchists and POUM on one side, and Communists and the government forces on the other began. Leaders of the CNT attempted to acquire the resignation of the Communists they felt were responsible for the conflict, but to no avail.

The next day CNT's regional committee declared a general strike. The CNT controlled the majority of the city, including the heavy artillery on the hill of Montjuïc overlooking the city. CNT militias disarmed more than 200 members of the security forces at their barricades, allowing only CNT vehicles to pass through. After unsuccessful appeals from the CNT leadership to end the fighting, the government began transferring Assault Guard from the front to Barcelona, and even destroyers from Valencia. On 5 May, the Friends of Durruti issued a pamphlet calling for "disarming of the paramilitary police… dissolution of the political parties…" and declared "Long live the social revolution! – Down with the counter-revolution!" The pamphlet was quickly denounced by the leadership of the CNT. The next day, the government agreed to a proposal by the leadership of the CNT-FAI, that called for the removal of the Assault Guards, and no reprisals against libertarians that had participated in the conflict, in exchange for the dismantling of barricades, and end of the general strike. However, neither the PSUC or the Assault Guards gave up their positions, and according to historian Antony Beevor "carried out violent reprisals against libertarians" By 8 May, the fighting was over.

These events, the fall of Largo Caballero's government, and the new prime ministership of Juan Negrín soon led to the collapse of much that the CNT had achieved immediately following the rising the previous July. At the beginning of July, the Aragonese organizations of the Popular Front publicly declared their support for the alternative council in Aragon, led by their president, Joaquín Ascaso. Four weeks later the 11th Division, under Enrique Líster, entered the region. On 11 August 1937, the Republican government, now situated in Valencia, dismissed the Regional Council for the Defense of Aragon. Líster's division was prepared for an offensive on the Aragonese front, but they were also sent to subdue the collectives run by the CNT-UGT and in dismantling the collective structures created the previous twelve months. The offices of the CNT were destroyed, and all the equipment belonging to its collectives was redistributed to landowners. The CNT leadership not only refused to allow the anarchist columns on the Aragon front to leave the front to defend the collectives, but they failed to condemn the government's actions against the collectives, causing much conflict between it and the rank and file membership of the union.

1938–1939
In April 1938, Juan Negrín was asked to form a government, and included Segundo Blanco, a member of the CNT, as minister of education, and by this point, the only CNT member left in the cabinet. At this point, many in the CNT leadership were critical of participation in the government, seeing it as dominated by the Communists. Prominent CNT leaders went so far as to refer to Blanco as "sop of the libertarian movement" and "just one more Negrínist." On the other side, Blanco was responsible for installing other CNT members into the ministry of education, and stopping the spread of "Communist propaganda" by the ministry.

In March 1939, with the war nearly over, CNT leaders participated in the National Defense Council's coup overthrowing the government of the Socialist Juan Negrín. Those involved included the CNT's Eduardo Val and José Manuel González Marín serving on the council, while Cipriano Mera's 70th Division provided military support, and Melechor Rodríquez became mayor of Madrid. The council attempted to negotiate a peace with General Francisco Franco, though he granted virtually none of their demands.

The CNT during the Francoist dictatorship 
In 1939 the Law of Political Responsibilities outlawed the CNT and expropriated its assets. At that time the organization had a million members and a large infrastructure. According to one estimate, roughly 160,000–180,000 members of the CNT were killed by the Franco government.

The CNT acted clandestinely inside Spain during the Franco years, as well as conducting activities from exile, and some members kept on fighting the Spanish State until 1948 through the guerrilla actions of maquis. There was much disagreement amongst factions of the CNT during these years. There was a major split after the National Committee inside Spain chose to support members of the Republican government in exile, while members of the Libertarian Movement in Exile (MLE) (basically the CNT-in-exile) stood against further collaboration with the government. Even Federica Montseny, who had joined the Republic as Minister of Health changed her stance on collaboration, describing the "futility of...participation in the government."

In January 1960, the MLE was formed by the CNT, the FAI, and the FIJL. In September of the next year, a congress was held in Limoges, at which the Sección Defensa Interior (DI) was created, to be partially funded by the CNT. By this point, a great majority of the CNT-in-exile had given up on political action as a tool, and one of the main goals of the DI was to assassinate Franco.

These divergent attitudes combined with Franco's repression to weaken the organization, and the CNT lost influence among the population inside Spain. In 1961 it began to regain strength, consolidating itself during the 1960s and 1970s thanks to penetration of anarcho-syndicalist ideology into Catholic anti-Francoist workers' organizations such as the Hermandad Obrera de Acción Católica (HOAC, "Worker Brethren of Catholic Action") or Juventud Obrera Católica (JOC, "Catholic Worker Youth").

During the "transition" 

After Franco's death in November 1975 and the beginning of Spain's transition to democracy, the CNT was the only social movement to refuse to sign the 1977 Moncloa Pact, an agreement amongst politicians, political parties, and trade unions to plan how to operate the economy during the transition. In 1979, the CNT held its first congress since 1936 as well as several mass meetings, the most remarkable one in Montjuïc. Views put forward in this congress would set the pattern for the CNT's line of action for the following decades: no participation in union elections, no acceptance of state subsidies, no acknowledgment of works councils, and support of union sections.

In this first congress, held in Madrid, a minority sector in favor of union elections split from the CNT, initially calling themselves CNT Valencia Congress (referring to the alternative congress held in this city), and later Confederación General del Trabajo (CGT) after an April 1989 court decision determined that they could not use the CNT initials. In 1990, a group of CGT members left this union because they rejected the CGT's policy of accepting government subsidies, founding Solidaridad Obrera.

One year before, the 1978 Scala Case affected the CNT. An explosion killed three people in a Barcelona night club. The authorities alleged that striking workers "blew themselves up", and arrested surviving strikers, implicating them in the crime. CNT members declared that the prosecution sought to criminalize their organization:

After its legalization, the CNT began efforts to recover the expropriations of 1939. The basis for such recovery would be established by Law 4/1986, which required the return of the seized properties, and the unions' right to use or yield the real estate. Since then the CNT has been claiming the return of these properties from the State.

In 1996, the Economic and Social Council facilities in Madrid were squatted by 105 CNT militants. This body is in charge of the repatriation of the accumulated union wealth. In 2004 an agreement was reached between the CNT and the District Attorney's Office, through which all charges were dropped against the hundred prosecuted for this occupation.

Current status 

The number of members currently in the CNT is not known. The regions with the largest CNT membership are the Centre (Madrid and surrounding area), the North (Basque country), Andalucía, Catalonia and the Balearic Islands.

Symbols and culture 

The CNT, owing to its interests in the radical transformation of society, has sought to make free knowledge and culture accessible to workers, a task which has been developed through the support of the anarchist academies. The School of Anarchist Militants was an institution which, by means of anarchist pedagogy, sought to ensure that "groups of teenagers could acquire the knowledge and the personal responsibility essential to work in collectives such as those of entertainers and accountants." Through the Anselmo Lorenzo Foundation, the CNT manages its cultural heritage, edits books, and organizes conferences and colloquies. Also, some sections of the CNT have supported and promoted Esperanto.

The flag of the CNT is the traditional flag of anarcho-syndicalism, which joins diagonally the red color of the labour movement and the black color of anarchism, as a negation of nationalism and reaffirmation of internationalism.

The anthem of the CNT is A las barricadas (To the Barricades), written by the Polish poet Wacław Święcicki with music by Józef Pławiński in 1883. Święcicki and Pławiński's work, called Warszawianka, was given Spanish lyrics by Valeriano Orobón Fernández and published with some musical arrangements for mixed choir by Ángel Miret in 1933.

Several postage stamps were issued by the CNT during the Spanish Civil War. Other surviving artifacts of this period are posters,
movie tickets, and other objects related to the companies which were collectivized during the Spanish Revolution of 1936.

George Orwell fought in the Spanish Civil War in the militia of Workers' Party of Marxist Unification (POUM), a revolutionary Trotskyist party (and therefore opposed to the Soviet Union line) whose militants were allied with the CNT during the revolution and to which Andrés Nin belonged. Orwell described in his book Homage to Catalonia the time during which Barcelona rose up with the CNT and anarchism. In the ninth chapter of his book, Orwell commented that "As far as my purely personal preferences went I would have liked to join the Anarchists."

In Ernest Hemingway's 1940 book For Whom the Bell Tolls, Maria's fascist captors print U.H.P. on her forehead with iodine after cutting her hair.

Robert Capa photographed the death of the Valencian Columna Alcoiana militiaman Federico Borrell García during the Spanish Civil War in the snapshot called "Death of a Loyalist Soldier". This photograph has become a famous image which shows the calamity of war.

In 1936, the film industry was collectivized and produced short films such as En la brecha (In the Gap, 1937). The CNT has been portrayed in recent Spanish filmmaking by the Vicente Aranda's film Libertarias (1996), which shows a group of militiamen (and especially militiawomen) at the Aragon front during the Spanish Civil War.

References

Film
 Living Utopia Anarchism/Anarcho-Syndicalism in Spain from around 1880–1940 Documentary by Juan Gamero, (1997).

Sources

 
  Excerpts from the 1998 edition of Anarcosindicalismo básico were translated by Jeff Stein and published first in the Anarcho-Syndicalist Review, then as a pamphlet (PDF linked). Direct quotations in this article follow Stein's wording for passages he has translated. Note that the pagination of the linked PDF places two pages of the pamphlet on each PDF page; cited page numbers follow the pamphlet itself.
 
 
 
 
 
 
 
 Fernández, Frank, Cuban Anarchism: The History of a Movement, See Sharp Press.

External links

  
  Fundación de Estudios Libertarios Anselmo Lorenzo (FAL)
  Directorio de Sindicatos, Federaciones y Confederaciones de la CNT (Directory of unions, federations, and confederations of the CNT)
  Periódico CNT (CNT Journal)
 Articles on the CNT from the Kate Sharpley Library
 News and historical articles from libcom.org
  Images of CNT-related posters
 CNT del Interior Archives at the International Institute of Social History
 Footage of interviews with CNT-people, for the film De toekomst van '36 (The future of '36), at the International Institute of Social History

 
International Workers' Association
Anti-Francoism
Anti-fascist organisations in Spain
Trade unions established in 1910
Syndicalism
Anarchist organisations in Spain
Libertarian socialist organizations
Anarchist organizations in Europe
1910 establishments in Spain
Syndicalist trade unions